The Assam Regiment is an infantry regiment of the Indian Army. The regiment consists of 25 battalions: 17 regular battalions, 3 Rashtriya Rifles battalions, 5 Territorial Army battalions (including 2 ecological battalions). It recruits exclusively from all the eight Northeastern states of India.

History

The regiment was raised on 15 June 1941 in Shillong by Lt. Col. Ross Howman to meet the claim of the then undivided state of Assam for its own fighting unit and to counter the threat of the Japanese invasion of India. The area of Elephant Falls in Shillong was chosen to raise the first battalion and it was there, under British instructors, that the first troops were trained. The initial draft of the regiment was drawn from undivided Assam, and consisted of the doughty Ahoms of Assam who had proved their martial prowess by defeating the Mughals at the Battle of Saraighat. The hardy, tough and cheerful Misings, Boros, Nagas, Kukis, Khasis, karbi , Garos, Meiteis and later on, the Adis, Nishis, Monpas, other tribes of Arunachal Pradesh, northeast India domiciled Gorkhas and Sikkimese and other tribes were also drafted into the regiment and, today, the regiment can boast of being composed of troops of diverse customs, cultures, languages, traditions and ethos belonging to all the eight Northeastern states of India.

Within six months of its raising, the regiment was ordered to move to Digboi to defend the oil fields. In early 1942, it moved to Ledo and was involved in reconnoitering the alignment for the famous Stilwell Road. In 1944, when the invasion of India by Japan was imminent, the regiment was moved to Jessami and Kharasom to delay the advance of the Japanese 31st Division. The young regiment soon proved its capabilities within three years of its raising, at the consecutive battles of Jessami, the epic defence of Kohima and the capture of Aradura, all of which were awarded as battle honours (now known as pre-independence battle honours) to the regiment.
The regiment earned high praise for its combat skills in World War II. In its very first operation, the regiment won 71 gallantry awards. In addition, the regiment won six battle honours including Jessami, Kohima, Aradura, Toungoo, Kyaukmyaung bridge-head and Mawlaik. It was also awarded the theatre honour Burma: 1942–45. Seldom has a regiment won so many gallantry awards, battle honours and theatre awards in a single campaign.

Two battalions were part of the Indian Peace Keeping Forces in Sri Lanka in 1988 and a battalion served in Cambodia in 1993 as part of the United Nations Transitional Authority in Cambodia. Five Territorial Army (TA) battalions (including 2 Eco battalions) and three Rashtriya Rifles (RR) battalions are affiliated with the regiment. The unique cultural and tribal character of the regiment makes for a fine combination of cheerful, tough and willing soldiers who excel in operations in mountainous and jungle terrain. The regimental colours are Black and Scarlet (state colours of undivided Assam) and Green (the colour of the infantry). Gold (colour) was added on the occasion of the Golden jubilee. Badges are of silver with black backings. The side arm is the 'Dah'. The regimental language is Hindi. When spoken in the regiment, it is a quaint and unique mixture of Hindi generously sprinkled with words from all the northeastern languages and sounds cryptic to the uninitiated.

The regiment, from a small group of three battalions at the time of independence, has now become a 25-Battalions strong force with 17 regular Battalions, 3 Rashtriya Rifles Battalions, 5 Territorial Army Battalions (including 2 Eco Battalions) and 2 Battalions of Arunachal Scouts. Since independence, battalions of the regiment have participated in the Sino-Indian War of 1962 and all the conflicts with Pakistan. The regiment was awarded a battle honour for its tenacious defence at Chaamb in the Indo-Pakistani War of 1971. Two of its battalions, 4 Assam and 7 Assam, have had the privilege of being part of the Indian Peace Keeping Force (IPKF) in Sri Lanka and 1 Assam, 15 Assam and 10 Assam have the unique distinction of being part of the UN Peace Keeping Force in Cambodia (UNTAC), Lebanon (UNIFIL) and the Democratic Republic of the Congo (MONUSCO) respectively.

Insignia and greeting
The regiment's insignia is the one-horned rhino, which is worn on the berets and belts that the soldiers (the self-named "Rhinos") wear. In India, rhinos are found in the state of Assam which is also known for its tea gardens and oil refineries. The regimental salutation of "tagra raho" ("stay strong/fit") is unique in the Indian Army. This unique greeting adopted by the regiment was introduced by Maj Gen S.C. Barbora, who commanded 2 Assam Regiment in 1960s. Originally he was commissioned in 1 Assam Regiment. The Commanding Officer used to enquire about the morale of the Rhinos' (soldiers) by asking them "Tagra Hai ?" ("are you strong/fit?") Invariably, the answer used to be "Tagra Hai Saheb" ("I am strong/fit, sir"). This greeting became popular in a very short time.

Post-Independence

Theatre Honour
J&K 1947-48 [1]
J&K, 1971

Battle honours 
Chhamb, 1971

Honours and awards 
Source

1 Ashoka Chakra – 2016 Havaldar Hangpan Dada
9 Param Vishisht Seva Medals, 
2 Maha Vir Chakra,
8 Kirti Chakra,
5 Vir Chakras,
20 Shaurya Chakras,
4 Padma Shris,
4 Ati Vishisht Seva Medals,
13 Yudh Seva Medals,
180 Sena Medals and
35 Vishisht Seva Medals.

Regimental battalions 

1st Battalion – Always First
2nd Battalion – Second to None
3rd Battalion – Phantom Third
4th Battalion – Formidable Fourth
5th Battalion – Fighting Fifth
6th Battalion – Sabre Sixth
7th Battalion – Striking Seventh
8th Battalion – Head Hunters
9th Battalion – Nimble Ninth
10th Battalion – Thundering Tenth
12th Battalion – Daring Dozen
14th Battalion – Ferocious Fourteenth
15th Battalion – One Five
16th Battalion – Soaring Sixteen
17th Battalion – Saggital Ek Saat
119 Infantry Battalion (TA) : Shillong, Meghalaya
165 Infantry Battalion (TA) – Manipur Terriers : Imphal, Manipur
166 Infantry Battalion (TA) – Tezpur Terriers : Tezpur, Assam
134 Infantry Battalion (TA) (Eco-Task Force) – Eastern Planters : Rangiya, Assam
135 Infantry Battalion (TA) (Eco-Task Force) – Green Rhinos : Sonitpur, Assam
35 Rashtriya Rifles
42 Rashtriya Rifles
59 Rashtriya Rifles

42 Rashtriya Rifles, formed specially to combat insurgency and terrorism, came into existence at a simple inaugural ceremony at the Assam Regimental Centre at Happy Valley in Shillong. Major General I. J. S. Bora, GOC 101 Area, unfurled the Rashtriya Rifles (RR) flag heralding its formal birth.  While four RR battalions had already been raised in the recent past, the 41st RR battalion (Maratha Light Infantry) was simultaneously raised in Karnataka's Belgaum. Maj. Gen. Bora said that as Meghalaya was relatively peaceful, there was no contemplation of deployment of armed forces at present. The force, raised to relieve the Army of counter insurgency operations, proved its mettle both in Jammu and Kashmir and other parts of the northeast.

The 3rd battalion of the regiment, 3 Assam (Phantom Third), recently celebrated its Diamond Jubilee. 6 Assam (Sabre Sixth) has performed ceremonial duties at Rashtrapati Bhavan and was selected for its outstanding work in counter terrorist operations. 14 Assam (Ferocious Fourteenth) won the Division and Command Football Championships and had fielded four players for the Army Reds & Greens. It had also won the first position in the Division Cambrian Patrol Championship 2009–2010. 10 Assam (Thundering Tenth) won the division firing and sniper competition for the year 2011–2012. The contingent of the Assam Regiment was judged "Best Marching Contingent" thrice in the Republic Day celebrations held at Delhi in 1995, 2004 and 2016. The team of the Assam Regimental Centre won the 'Army Young Blood Firing Championship' in 2005 and stood second in 2006.

12 Assam (Daring Dozen) conducted outstanding Counter-insurgency Operations in Arunachal Pradesh, from Mar 2012-Jun 2015, arresting 48 militants, killing 4, seizing 37 weapons and taking 7 surrenders. The battalion also had an outstanding performance in sports and won the 'Best In Sports' trophy in 2015.

In 2019, the 8 Assam participated in Yudh Abhyas 2019, representing India, along the US Army.

In 2020, 12 Assam was deployed in the 2020 China–India skirmishes and 17 Assam was deployed in Ladakh as a part of additional forces.

Uniform
The regiment wears a hat, called the Rhino Hat, with the right side lowered, a Rhino with a black diamond-shaped flash on the left (Rhino facing front) and black strap under the chin. 
A ceremonial 'Dah' is also carried with the belt on ceremonial occasions.

See also
 Assam Rifles
Badluram ka Badan

References

British Indian Army infantry regiments
Infantry regiments of the Indian Army from 1947
Military units and formations established in 1941
R